Hendry Bernardo Thomas Suazo (born 23 February 1985), also known as Buchuca, is a Honduran former footballer who played as a defensive midfielder.

Thomas has been described as displaying a "rugged approach driven by his ample physical gifts and his significant work rate and supplemented with enough technical ability to excel in his preferred holding midfield role."

Club career

Early years
Thomas made his debut with Olimpia on 26 September 2001, against Real Comayagua when he was only 16 years of age. He continued to play for Olimpia of Tegucigalpa in the Liga Nacional de Honduras. He has been a regular member of the Honduras national football team since 2005. Thomas is the cousin of fellow footballers Maynor Suazo, David Suazo and Allan Lalín. He scored Olimpia's 2000th goal in the club's history. During his time at Olimpia, the club went on to win many Liga Nacional de Fútbol games. Thomas underwent a trial period with French club Toulouse. However, the trial was unsuccessful.

Wigan Athletic
In July 2009, Thomas made his move to Premier League side Wigan Athletic on a three-year deal, subject to being granted a work permit. Wigan also made a failed attempt to sign Thomas in 2008 after work permit issues arose but on 2 July, it was officially announced that he would join Wigan and he was given the shirt number 6. He made his debut against Aston Villa on 15 August 2009, and assisted a goal in a 2–0 victory for Wigan. In his first three matches, he won one 'Man of the Match' (Aston Villa) and one 'Most Impressive Player' (Manchester United) award. Early on in the season, Thomas formed a strong midfield partnership with Mohamed Diamé and was praised by Roberto Martínez. On 16 January 2010, Thomas received a red card for the first time in his Premier League career due to a second bookable offence in a 2–0 win over Wolverhampton Wanderers. In his first season, he made 33 appearances (31 in the Premier League, 1 in League Cup and FA Cup).

In the 2009–10 and 2010–11 seasons, Thomas was a regular member of the team. In the opening weeks of the 2010–11 season, Thomas received praise from his manager Roberto Martinez after a string of all-action displays in central midfield. Towards the end of the 2010–11 season with Wigan facing relegation, Thomas rarely featured, often being on the bench or being left out of the squad due to the return of James McCarthy from injury. On the last day of the season, Wigan would maintain their Premier League place for the next season after beating Stoke City 1–0, thanks to Hugo Rodallega. Despite losing his place in the starting line-up to McCarthy, Thomas still managed to make 30 appearances (24 in the Premier League, 4 in the League Cup and 2 in FA Cup). One month after the season ended, Martinez stated Thomas was still in his plans for the next season.

However, in the 2011–12 season, the club went through various tactical changes as well as new signings, and Thomas struggled to even make matchday squads during the first half of the season. Thomas would go on to make only two appearances, both in League Cup and FA Cup. In the January transfer window, Martinez insisted Thomas would not leave the club, maintaining he still had a future at Wigan by hinting at the offer of a new contract. However, at the end of 2011–12 season, Thomas was released by Wigan, along with several other players upon the expiration of their contracts.

Major League Soccer
On 20 August 2012, Thomas signed with the Colorado Rapids of Major League Soccer. Shortly after moving to Colorado, he spoke highly of his move, stating that he's looking forward to the challenge. On 31 August 2012, he made his debut in a 1–0 loss against Portland Timbers. After the game, he stated to the media that he was happy with his debut, but the result was disappointing. After a half season, he signed an improved long-term deal with the club. On 30 March 2013, he scored his first goal for the club, from a penalty, in a 2–2 draw against the Timbers. After the game, Thomas updated his Facebook profile, dedicating his goal to, "God, because without him, nothing is possible. Family, because they are there through the good and the bad and all my Honduran people that wish me well and always message me with positive vibes."

Thomas followed coach Oscar Pareja to FC Dallas for the 2014 season. Thomas missed the second half of the season due to injury. In December 2014, FC Dallas declined the option to sign Thomas for the 2015 season.

International career
Thomas made his debut for Honduras in a February 2005 UNCAF Nations Cup match against Panama and has earned a total of 52 caps, scoring 2 goals. He has represented his country in 15 FIFA World Cup qualification matches and at the 2008 Summer Olympics as well at the 2010 FIFA World Cup. He also played at the 2005 and 2009 UNCAF Nations Cups as well as at the 2005 and 2011 CONCACAF Gold Cups.

His most recent international was a September 2011 friendly match against Colombia.

International goals

|}

Personal life
Thomas received his U.S. green card in October 2013, which qualifies him as a domestic player for MLS roster purposes.

While playing for the Colorado Rapids, Thomas received the nickname "El Patrón" from teammates Jaime Castrillón and Luis Eduardo Zapata.  Prior to that, Thomas had been referred to as "El Doctór" while playing in Honduras.

References

External links

1985 births
Living people
People from La Ceiba
Association football midfielders
Honduran footballers
Honduras international footballers
Footballers at the 2008 Summer Olympics
Olympic footballers of Honduras
2005 UNCAF Nations Cup players
2005 CONCACAF Gold Cup players
2009 UNCAF Nations Cup players
2010 FIFA World Cup players
2011 CONCACAF Gold Cup players
C.D. Olimpia players
Wigan Athletic F.C. players
Colorado Rapids players
FC Dallas players
Fort Lauderdale Strikers players
Liga Nacional de Fútbol Profesional de Honduras players
Premier League players
Major League Soccer players
North American Soccer League players
Honduran expatriate footballers
Expatriate footballers in England
Expatriate soccer players in the United States